Bettina Gruber (born 31 January 1985) is a Swiss cross-country skier who competed between 2002 and 2016. At the 2010 Winter Olympics in Vancouver, she finished 18th in the team sprint event.

Gruber's best World Cup finish was fifth in the team sprint event at Russia in January 2010.

Cross-country skiing results
All results are sourced from the International Ski Federation (FIS).

Olympic Games

World Championships

World Cup

References

External links

1985 births
Cross-country skiers at the 2010 Winter Olympics
Cross-country skiers at the 2014 Winter Olympics
Living people
Olympic cross-country skiers of Switzerland
Swiss female cross-country skiers
Universiade medalists in cross-country skiing
Universiade silver medalists for Switzerland
Competitors at the 2009 Winter Universiade
21st-century Swiss women